Carl May FAcSS (born 1961, in Farnham, Surrey) is a British sociologist. He researches in the fields of medical sociology and science and technology studies. Formerly based at Southampton University and Newcastle University, he is now Professor of Medical Sociology at the London School of Hygiene and Tropical Medicine. Carl May was elected an Academician of the Academy of Learned Societies in the Social Sciences in 2006. He was appointed a Senior Investigator at the National Institute for Health and Care Research (NIHR) in 2010. His work falls into two distinct themes.

In medical sociology he has researched and published mainly on professional-patient interaction and relationships in clinical settings. This work has its roots in  social constructionism and the social theory of Michel Foucault. Over the past decade his work has become more focused on the ways that interaction processes are embedded in, and represent, their socio-technical contexts. This led to studies of the interaction between health technologies and their users. These studies have explored the sociology of telemedicine In a later paper, he argues that the benefits of telemedicine does not outweigh the additional burden on patients and their social support networks.

In Science and Technology Studies his work investigates how innovations become routinely embedded in health care and other organizational systems. This research has led to Normalization Process Theory, developed with Tracy Finch and others, including Victor Montori.  This is a sociological theory of the implementation, embedding, and integration of new technologies and organizational innovations. It is founded on, and has superseded, an earlier Normalization Process Model for evaluating randomized controlled trials, health technologies, and complex interventions  in health care. Most recently, May and colleagues have applied Normalization Process Theory to explaining patient non-compliance with treatment, proposing that a proportion of non-compliance is structurally induced by healthcare systems themselves as patients are overburdened by treatment. To counter this, they have proposed Minimally Disruptive Medicine, which seeks to take account of its effects on patients' workload.

References

External links
 Normalization Process Theory Website
 Carl May's academia.edu page
 Carl May's personal website
 

1961 births
Fellows of the Academy of Social Sciences
Academics of Newcastle University
British sociologists
Medical sociologists
People from Farnham
Living people
Academics of the University of Southampton
Science and technology studies scholars
NIHR Senior Investigators